Ivan Bloch may refer to:
 Iwan Bloch (1872–1922), German sexologist
 Jan Gotlib Bloch (1836–1902), Polish banker and military theorist